Fireblade (acquired by StackPath) is an Israeli company founded in 2008. It developed the first cloud-based bot-management solution and a multi-tier SaaS security suite powered by reputational and behavioral firewalls, to protect websites against DDoS attacks, web application attacks and a variety of automated attacks, improving website health, security and performance.
It offers integration with cPanel and WHM Fireblade was founded by Shay Rapaport and Erez Azaria (CEO and CTO respectively).

Fireblade's extensive bot management solution offers protection against credential stuffing, brute force attacks, application layer DDoS attacks, web spam and scraping  It also offers dynamic performance optimization, a 30 Points of Presence tier-1 CDN and other tools.

Features
Protection against
DDoS attacks
Spam, scraping and abuse control
CMS vulnerability exploitation
Brute force login/password attack
Web application attacks
Firewalls: reputational an behavioral 
On top of a traditional firewall, these firewalls scan the behavior and the context, searching for possible attacks or threats and to expose which is human and which is a machine/bot.
Dynamic site optimization 
A tier-1 CDN access with 30 global Points of Presence 
Load balancer and failover
Monitoring tools
Uptime monitoring
Health & performance analytics
Security Forensic
Real-time alerts
Mobile application for monitoring

References

External links
 Fireblade website

2008 establishments in Israel
Technology companies of Israel
Technology companies established in 2008
DDoS mitigation companies